The Electrical, Electronic, Telecommunications and Plumbing Union, known as the EETPU, was a British trade union formed in 1968 as a union for electricians and plumbers, which went through three mergers from 1992 to now be part of Unite the Union.

History
The union was formed in July 1968 with the merger of the Electrical Trades Union and the Plumbing Trades Union to form the Electrical, Electronic & Telecommunications Union & Plumbing Trades Union, which became the Electrical, Electronic, Telecommunications & Plumbing Union in 1973.  Archives of government papers  show that "a period of severe industrial unrest" began in September 1970.  Local authority manual workers wanted a £30 minimum weekly wage. A Committee of Inquiry recommended a 14.5 per cent increase, but the government considered it to be too high. In the winter that followed (i.e. winter of 1970/1971) an electricity power workers strike caused the Cabinet to declare a national emergency. The first miners' strike followed in 1972.

For many years the EETPU owned and operated its own Technical Training Department which was based at Cudham Hall in Kent. This received much acclaim and press attention in its day.

In September 1982, Chapple became President of the Trades Union Congress and was succeeded by Eric Hammond in 1984. Chapple was elevated to the House of Lords as Lord Chapple of Hoxton in 1985.

In 1986 the union's members replaced print workers that had been sacked by News International, prompting the Wapping dispute that led to the irrevocable change of Fleet Street.

Expulsion from the TUC
The union had its own approach to making deals with companies, and thus often clashed with the TUC from which it was expelled for violating the Bridlington Agreement governing the transfer of members between TUC unions. The EETPU had developed a policy of signing single union agreements in companies where it had few members. In 1987, the TUC asked the EETPU to retract from these agreements at Yuasa (a Japanese battery company), Thorn-EMI and Orion (a Japanese electronics company). The EETPU refused and its 225,000 workers were expelled.  Around 5,000 members, led by John Aitkin, decided to split away in order to remain within the mainstream trade union movement, and founded the Electrical and Plumbing Industries Union.  It has since been revealed that the union colluded with the Thatcher government in the 1980s, giving advice to ministers about how to 'deal' with left wing unions, and possibly supplied a list of left wing members to the government and security services

Mergers
The union merged with the Amalgamated Engineering Union to become the Amalgamated Engineering and Electrical Union (AEEU) in May 1992, so the electricians were now part of the TUC. The AEEU was led by Ken Jackson, who belonged to the EETPU. The AEEU merged with the Manufacturing, Science and Finance (MSF) to become Amicus in 2001. Amicus, the largest private sector union with 1.2m workers, was led by Derek Simpson since June 2002. Tony Dubbins, of the NGA in the Wapping dispute, became Joint Deputy General Secretary in 2004. Amicus merged with the Transport and General Workers' Union in May 2007 to become Unite the Union.

Amalgamations
A large number of small unions amalgamated with the EETPU:

 1980: Steel Industry Management Association, Telecommunications Staff Association, United Kingdom Association of Professional Engineers
 1982: British Transport Officers' Guild
 1983: Association of Management and Professional Staffs
 1984: Rolls-Royce Management Association
 1989: Association of British Professional Divers, Ministry of Defence Staff Association, National Association of Senior Probation Officers, Nelson and District Power Loom Overlookers' Association, Springfield Foreman's Association
 1990: Haslingden and District Power Loom Overlookers' Association, Institute of Journalists Trade Union, National Association of Fire Officers, National Association of Power Loom Overlookers, Nationally Integrated Caring Employees, Prison Service Union, Television and Film Production Employees' Association
 1991: Colne and District Power Loom Overlookers' Association
 1992: British Cement Staffs Association

Election results
The union sponsored many Labour Party candidates in each Parliamentary election.

Leadership

General Secretaries
1968: Frank Chapple
1984: Eric Hammond

General Presidents
1968: Les Cannon
1972: Frank Chapple (jointly with general secretary post)
1975: Tom Breakell
1986: Paul Gallagher

Plumbing National Secretaries
1968: Charles Lovell
1988: Bill Gannon

References

External links
Catalogue of the EETPU archives, held at the Modern Records Centre, University of Warwick

 
Defunct trade unions of the United Kingdom
1968 establishments in the United Kingdom
Trade unions established in 1968
Trade unions disestablished in 1992
Trade unions based in London